INL may refer to:

Organisations:
 Bureau of International Narcotics and Law Enforcement Affairs, US
 Idaho National Laboratory
 Independent Newspapers, a New Zealand company
 Indian National League, a Muslim-based political party
 Institut des nanotechnologies de Lyon, a research institute in France
 Instituut voor Nederlandse Lexicologie ("Institute for Dutch Lexicology"), former name of the Instituut voor de Nederlandse Taal, part of the Dutch Language Union
 International Iberian Nanotechnology Laboratory

Other:
 Falls International Airport (IATA Code: INL), Minnesota, USA
 Inner nuclear layer, in the retina
 Integral nonlinearity, in electrical engineering, a measure of digital-to-analog converter or analog-to-digital converter accuracy
 Inter-National League, an ice hockey league